Scottish Westminster constituencies were Scottish constituencies of the House of Commons of the Parliament of Great Britain, normally at the Palace of Westminster, from 1708 to 1801, and have been constituencies of the House of Commons of the Parliament of the United Kingdom, also at Westminster, since 1801. Constituency boundaries have changed on various occasions, and are now subject to both periodical and ad hoc reviews of the Boundary Commission for Scotland.

Since 1950 each Scottish constituency has been either a burgh constituency or a county constituency, defined by geographic boundaries and representing a seat for one Member of Parliament (MP). More historically there have been university constituencies and constituencies representing two or three parliamentary seats.

Scottish local government counties and burghs were abolished in 1975. A burgh constituency is now one with a predominantly urban electorate, and a county constituency is one with more than a token rural electorate.

Counties and burghs were replaced with two-tier regions and districts and unitary islands council areas, and the regions and districts were replaced with unitary council areas in 1996.

The history of constituency boundaries can be divided into eleven distinct periods, as below, each starting with the date of a general election when a new set of boundaries was first used.

1708 to 1832 

As a result of the union of Scotland with England and Wales and the creation of the Parliament of Great Britain in 1707, Scotland had 48 constituencies representing seats for 45 MPs in the House of Commons of the new parliament at Westminster. Westminster was previously the meeting place for the Parliament of England, which covered both England and Wales.

Scottish Westminster constituencies were first used in the 1708 general election. Prior to that election Scotland was represented in the new parliament by MPs who were co-opted as commissioners of the former Parliament of Scotland.

In the Parliament of Great Britain, Scotland had 15 burgh constituencies and 33 county constituencies, with each representing a seat for one MP. The county constituencies included, however, three pairs of alternating constituencies, so that only one member of a pair was represented at any one time. Therefore, Scotland had more constituencies than seats. With the exception of Edinburgh, the burgh constituencies consisted of districts of burghs.

1708 boundaries were used for all subsequent elections of the Parliament of Great Britain.

The creation of the Parliament of the United Kingdom in 1801 was a merger of the Parliament of Ireland with the Parliament of Great Britain. The first general election of this new parliament was the general election of 1802, and there was at that stage no change to the boundaries of any pre-existing Westminster constituency.

1802 boundaries were used also in the general elections of 1806, 1807, 1812, 1818, 1820, 1826, 1830 and 1831.

1832 to 1868 

For the 1832 general election, Scottish Westminster constituencies were redefined by the Representation of the People (Scotland) Act 1832.

As a result of the legislation, there were 21 burgh constituencies and 30 county constituencies. Except for Edinburgh and Glasgow, which were two-seat constituencies, each Scottish constituency represented a seat for one MP. Therefore, Scotland had 53 parliamentary seats.

The constituencies related nominally to counties and burghs, but boundaries for parliamentary purposes were not necessarily those for other purposes. 14 of the burgh constituencies were districts of burghs.

1832 boundaries were used also in the general elections of 1835, 1837, 1841, 1847, 1852, 1857, 1859 and 1865.

1868 to 1885 

For the 1868 general election Scottish Westminster constituencies were redefined by the Representation of the People (Scotland) Act 1868. For the same general election, boundaries in England were redefined by the Representation of the People Act 1867 and there was, effectively, a transfer of seven parliamentary seats from England to Scotland.

As a result of the legislation, Scotland had 22 burgh constituencies, 32 county constituencies and two university constituencies. Except for Edinburgh, Dundee and Glasgow, each Scottish constituency represented a seat for one MP. Edinburgh and Dundee represented two seats each, and Glasgow represented three seats.  Therefore, Scotland was entitled to 60 MPs.

The constituencies again related nominally to counties and burghs but, again, boundaries for parliamentary purposes were not necessarily those for other purposes.

1868 boundaries were used also in the general elections of 1874 and 1880.

1885 to 1918 

The Redistribution of Seats Act 1885 redefined the boundaries of English, Scottish and Welsh constituencies, and the new boundaries were first used in the 1885 general election. The boundaries of Irish constituencies were not affected.

In Scotland, as a result of the legislation, there were 32 burgh constituencies, 37 county constituencies and two university constituencies. Except for Dundee, which was a two-seat constituency, each Scottish constituency represented a seat for one MP. Therefore, Scotland had 72 parliamentary seats.

The 1885 legislation detailed boundary changes but did not detail boundaries for all constituencies. For a complete picture of boundaries in Scotland, it has to be read in conjunction with the Representation of the People (Scotland) Act 1832 and the Representation of the People (Scotland) Act 1868.

As under legislation of 1832 and 1868, constituencies related nominally to counties and burghs, but boundaries for parliamentary purposes were not necessarily those for other purposes. Also, boundaries for other purposes were altered by the Local Government (Scotland) Act 1889 and by later related legislation.

1885 boundaries were used also in the general elections of 1886, 1892, 1895, 1900, 1906, January 1910 and December 1910.

1918 to 1950 

The Representation of the People Act 1918 redefined constituency boundaries in relation to local government boundaries of the time, and the new constituency boundaries were first used in the 1918 general election.

Scotland had 32 burgh constituencies, 38 county constituencies and one university constituency. One burgh constituency, Dundee, represented seats for two MPs, and the university constituency, Combined Scottish Universities, represented seats for three MPs. Each of the others elected one MP. Therefore, the legislation provided parliamentary seats for a total of 74 Scottish MPs.

1918 boundaries were used also in the general elections of 1922, 1923, 1924, 1929, 1931, 1935 and 1945.

1950 to 1955 

For the 1950 general election, under the Representation of the People Act 1948 and the House of Commons (Redistribution of Seats) Act 1949, Scotland had 32 burgh constituencies and 39 county constituencies, with each electing one MP. Therefore, Scotland had 71 parliamentary seats.

Each constituency was entirely within a county or a grouping of two counties, or was if the cities of Aberdeen, Dundee, Edinburgh and Glasgow are regarded as belonging, respectively to the county of Aberdeen, the county of Angus, the county of Midlothian and the county of Lanark.

For the 1951 general election there were changes to the boundaries of six Scottish constituencies, but there was no change to county groupings, to the total numbers of constituencies and MPs, or to constituency names.

1955 to 1974 

The results of the First Periodical Review became effective for the 1955 general election.

The review defined 32 burgh constituencies and 39 county constituencies, with each electing one MP. Therefore, Scotland had 71 parliamentary seats.

Each constituency was entirely within a county or a grouping of two or three counties, or was if the cities of Aberdeen, Dundee, Edinburgh and Glasgow are regarded as belonging, respectively to the county of Aberdeen, the county of Angus, the county of Midlothian and the county of Lanark.

1955 boundaries were used also for the general election of 1959.

There were changes to the boundaries of nine Scottish constituencies for the 1964 general election but there was no change to county groupings, to the total numbers of constituencies and MPs, or to constituency names.

1964 boundaries were used also for the 1966 and 1970 general elections.

1974 to 1983 

The results of the Second Periodical Review, concluded in 1969, and of a subsequent interim review, concluded in 1972, became effective for the February 1974 general election.

The reviews defined 29 burgh constituencies and 42 county constituencies, with each electing one MP. Therefore, Scotland had 71 parliamentary seats.

Each constituency was entirely within a county or a grouping of two or three counties.

February 1974 boundaries were used also in the October 1974 and 1979 general elections.

1983 to 1997 

The results of the Third Periodical Review became effective for the 1983 general election.

The review defined 30 burgh constituencies and 42 county constituencies, with each electing one MP. Therefore, Scotland had 72 parliamentary seats.

In 1975, Scottish counties and burghs had been abolished for local government purposes, under the Local Government (Scotland) Act 1973, and the Third Periodical Review took account of new local government boundaries, which defined two-tier regions and districts and unitary islands council areas. No new constituency straddled a regional boundary, and no islands council area was divided between two constituencies.

The boundary commission was required to designate each new constituency as either burgh or county but had no predetermined basis on which to do so. The commission took the view that each constituency with more than a token rural electorate would be a county constituency, and others, predominantly urban, would be burgh constituencies.

1983 boundaries were used also in the 1987 and 1992 general elections.

1997 to 2005 

The results of the Fourth Periodical Review of the Boundary Commission for Scotland became effective, as a result of Order in Council SI 1995 No 1037 (S.90), for the 1997 general election.

The review defined 28 burgh constituencies and 44 county constituencies, with each electing one MP. Therefore, Scotland had 72 parliamentary seats.

Constituencies were defined in reference to the boundaries of local government regions and districts and islands areas effective on 1 June 1994, and each constituency was entirely within a region or a grouping of two or entirely within an islands area or a grouping of two. However, under the Local Government etc (Scotland) Act 1994, the regions and districts were abolished in favour of new council areas in 1996, the year before the new constituencies were first used in an election.

1997 boundaries were used also in the 2001 general election.

2005 to present 

The results of the Fifth Periodical Review became effective in Scotland for the 2005 general election.

The review defined 19 burgh constituencies and 40 county constituencies, with each electing one MP. Therefore, Scotland has 59 parliamentary seats.

Each constituency is entirely within a council area or a grouping of two or three council areas.

Proposed changes
The Boundary Commission for Scotland submitted their final proposals in respect of the Sixth Periodic Review of Westminster constituencies (the 2018 review) in September 2018. Although the proposals were immediately laid before Parliament they were not brought forward by the Government for approval. Accordingly, they did not come into effect for the 58th general election which took place on 12 December 2019, and which was contested using the constituency boundaries in place since 2010.

Under the terms of the Parliamentary Voting System and Constituencies Act 2011, the Sixth Review was based on reducing the total number of MPs from 650 to 600 and a strict electoral parity requirement that the electorate of all constituencies should be within a range of 5% either side of the electoral quota.

On 24 March 2020, the Minister of State for the Cabinet Office, Chloe Smith, issued a written statement to Parliament setting out the Government's thinking with regard to parliamentary boundaries. Subsequently, the Parliamentary Constituencies Act 2020 was passed into law on 14 December. This formally removed the duty to implement the 2018 review and set out the framework for future boundary reviews. The Act provided that the number of constituencies should remain at the current level of 650, rather than being reduced to 600, while retaining the requirement that the electorate should be no more than +/- 5% from the electoral quota.

The Act specified that the next review should be completed no later than 1 July 2023 and the Boundary Commission formally launched the 2023 review on 5 January 2021. The Commission calculated that the number of seats to be allocated to Scotland will decrease by 2, from 59 to 57. This includes the protected constituencies of Na h-Eileanan an Iar  and Orkney and Shetland.

As part of public consultations for the ongoing 2023 Periodic Review of Westminster constituencies, the Boundary Commission for Scotland proposed the following constituencies to be fought at the next United Kingdom general election. Following two periods of public consultation, revised proposals were published on 8 November 2022. Final proposals will be published by 1 July 2023.

Aberdeen North
Aberdeen South
Aberdeenshire Central
Aberdeenshire North and Moray East
Airdrie
Argyll, Bute and South Lochaber
Ayr, Carrick and Cumnock
Bathgate and Linlithgow
Bearsden and Campsie Fells
Berwickshire, Roxburgh and Selkirk
Caithness, Sutherland and Easter Ross
Central Ayrshire
Clackmannanshire and Forth Valley
Coatbridge and Bellshill
Dumfries and Galloway
Dumfriesshire, Clydesdale and Tweeddale
Dundee East and Arbroath
Dundee West
Dunfermline and East Ochils
East Kilbride and Strathaven
East Lothian and Lammermuirs
East Renfrewshire
Edinburgh East
Edinburgh North and Leith
Edinburgh South
Edinburgh South West
Edinburgh West
Falkirk
Glasgow North

Glasgow North East
Glasgow South
Glasgow South East
Glasgow South West
Glasgow West
Glenrothes
Hamilton and Clyde Valley
Inverclyde and Renfrewshire West
Inverness-shire and Wester Ross
Kilmarnock and Loudoun
Kilsyth Hills and Cumbernauld
Kirkcaldy and Cowdenbeath
Livingston
Midlothian
Motherwell and Clydesdale North
Na h-Eileanan an Iar
Nairn, Strathspey and Moray West
North Ayrshire and Arran
North East Fife
North Tayside
Orkney and Shetland
Paisley and Renfrewshire North
Paisley and Renfrewshire South
Perth and Loch Leven
Rutherglen
Stirling
West Aberdeenshire and Kincardine
West Dunbartonshire

See also 
 Constitutional reform in the United Kingdom
 Glasgow parliamentary constituencies
 List of Great Britain and UK Parliament constituencies in Scotland from 1707 for graphical representation by party

Notes and references 

 
  
 
Politics of Scotland